The Screen Tests are a series of short, silent, black-and-white film portraits by Andy Warhol, made between 1964 and 1966, generally showing their subjects from the neck up against plain backdrops.  The Screen Tests, of which 472 survive, depict a wide range of figures, many of them part of the mid-1960s downtown New York cultural scene.  Under Warhol’s direction, subjects of the Screen Tests attempted to sit motionless for around three minutes while being filmed, with the resulting movies projected in slow motion.  The films represent a new kind of portraiture—a slowly moving, nearly still image of a person.  Warhol's Screen Tests connect on one hand with the artist's other work in film, which emphasized stillness and duration (for example, Sleep (1964) and Empire (1964), and on the other hand with his focus after the mid-1960s on documenting his celebrity milieu in paintings and other works.

History and production

The Screen Tests were initially inspired by a 1962 New York City Police Department booklet entitled The Thirteen Most Wanted, which showed mug shots of wanted criminals.  The same booklet was the source of the images in Warhol’s short-lived mural entitled Thirteen Most Wanted Men at the 1964 New York World’s Fair, together with a series of paintings using the same images.  A second source for the Screen Tests was Warhol's interest in photo-booth portraits, which he had begun to use in 1963 for paintings such as Ethel Scull 36 Times. Like the Screen Tests, photo-booth portraits document the appearance of a sitter across successive moments in time.

In January, 1964, around the time he was working with the police booklet images to design the World's Fair mural, Warhol shot a series of short moving-image portraits of young men, the film canisters of which were labeled—in a riff on the booklet title—13 Most Beautiful. The first Screen Tests were made at the house of Winthrop Kellogg Edey, one of the subjects in 13 Most Beautiful. Each film is as long as the 100-foot length of film in the magazines for Warhol's Bolex movie camera (about three minutes), and shows a single subject presented in the style of the brochure's mug shots: from the neck up, with a featureless background, facing forward, with the portrait filling the frame from top to bottom.  The subjects were generally directed by Warhol to hold perfectly still and not blink for the three-minute duration of the filming.

After making these early shorts, Warhol began to incorporate the shooting of Screen Tests into the routine of his studio, The Factory, alongside the making of new paintings and other aspects of his enterprise.  The filming of Screen Tests was rarely prearranged.  There was an area set up for shooting, but the decision to make one was spontaneous, generally involving people who happened to be visiting The Factory.  Nearly all of the Screen Tests use the nearly motionless, front-facing style of the first films. Warhol varied the shooting conditions for individual films, changing the number of lights or their angles to alter the pattern of shadow on the subjects' faces and the backdrops behind them or using different lens aperture settings.  Some subjects sat for multiple Screen Tests on a single day.  By the end of 1966, two years after his first Screen Tests, Warhol had produced at least 500 of them, of which 472 survive.

The short films were not called Screen Tests until the end of 1965; until that time, Warhol labeled them “film portraits” or “stillies” (a portmanteau of "still-movies").  They were not screen tests in the general sense of the film industry, in that they were conceived as independent works of art and not a way of choosing people to act in a production.  Warhol made two longer films in 1965, Screen Test #1 and Screen Test #2, that more closely resemble traditional screen tests.

Reception and legacy
Film critic Philip Dodd listed the Screen Tests among his favorite films in 2002 when he voted for the Sight and Sound poll.

Selected Screen Test subjects
Many of the 472 surviving Screen Tests depict people who remain well known for their accomplishments or for their association with Warhol's circle. Following is a selection of people who appeared in Screen Tests who are also the subject of Wikipedia articles, chosen to give an overview of the range of Warhol's subjects. The definitive compilation of the Screen Tests and their subjects is Andy Warhol Screen Tests by Callie Angell (2006), the first volume of the catalogue raisoneė of Warhol's films.

See also 
 Andy Warhol filmography

References

External links 
 Andy Warhol Screen Tests Inventory - MOMA

Films directed by Andy Warhol
American silent short films
American black-and-white films
Avant-garde and experimental film series
1960s avant-garde and experimental films
1960s American films